Aimco or Apartment Investment and Management Company is a publicly traded real estate investment trust. As of December 31, 2020, the company owned 27 apartment communities comprising 6,342 apartment units in 12 states and the District of Columbia.

History
Aimco traces its roots to The Considine Company, formed in 1975 by Terry Considine. Aimco was incorporated on January 10, 1994.

On July 29, 1994, the company became a public company via an initial public offering.

In 1996, Aimco acquired Walters Management Company and the J.W. English Company.

In 1997, Aimco acquired National Housing Partnership Incorporated, which owned 87,659 apartments.

In October 1997, Aimco acquired 8,175 apartment units from Winthrop.

In 1998, Aimco acquired Insignia Financial Group in a $910 million transaction.

In 2000, the company acquired Oxford Realty Financial Group, which owned interests in 36,662 apartment units, for $314 million. Also in 2000, the company acquired the Oxford Tax-Exempt Fund for $206 million.

In 2002, Aimco acquired Casden Properties, founded by Alan Casden. The $1.5 billion acquisition included 17,383 apartments, including 6,356 conventional apartment units located in Southern California and 11,027 affordable apartment units in 25 states.

In 2003, the company was added to the S&P 500 index. It was removed from the index in December 2020.

In December 2020, it completed the corporate spin-off of Apartment Income REIT Corp.

References

External links

Financial services companies established in 1975
1975 establishments in Colorado
American companies established in 1975
Companies based in Denver
Companies listed on the New York Stock Exchange
Real estate investment trusts of the United States
Real estate companies established in 1975